A list of notable politicians of the Italian Communist Party:

A
Marisa Abbondanzieri
Nicola Adamo
Paolo Alatri
Mario Alicata
Giorgio Amendola
Gavino Angius
Giulio Carlo Argan
Walter Audisio

B
Franco Bassanini
Antonio Bassolino
Roberto Battaglia
Katia Bellillo
Enrico Berlinguer
Giovanni Berlinguer
Luigi Berlinguer
Mario Berlinguer
Pier Luigi Bersani
Fausto Bertinotti
Ranuccio Bianchi Bandinelli
Sandro Bondi
Amadeo Bordiga
Willer Bordon
Mercedes Bresso
Claudio Burlando

C
Massimo Cacciari
Giusto Catania
Sergio Chiamparino
Giulietto Chiesa
Massimo Cialente
Lucio Colletti
Paola Concia
Ludovico Corrao
Armando Cossutta
Rosario Crocetta

D
Massimo D'Alema
Michele D'Amico
Francescopaolo D'Angelosante
Pancrazio De Pasquale
Giuseppe Di Vittorio
Oliviero Diliberto

E
Vasco Errani

F
Italo Falcomatà
Guido Fanti
Piero Fassino
Bruno Ferrero
Anna Finocchiaro
Sergio Flamigni
Aniello Formisano
Loris Fortuna

G
Corrado Gabriele
Carlo Alberto Galluzzi
Sergio Garavini
Natalia Ginzburg
Antonio Giolitti
Franco Giordano
Anselmo Gouthier
Antonio Gramsci
Claudio Grassi
Ruggero Grieco
Franco Grillini
Renato Guttuso

I
Pietro Ingrao
Nilde Iotti
Felice Ippolito

L
Pio La Torre
Girolamo Li Causi
Maria Rita Lorenzetti

M
Lucio Magri
Francesca Marinaro
Graziella Mascia
Teresa Mattei
Raffaele Mattioli
Alberto Moravia
Roberto Musacchio
Fabio Mussi

N
Pasqualina Napoletano
Giorgio Napolitano
Alessandro Natta
Diego Novelli

O
Achille Occhetto
Gianni Oliva
Andrea Orlando

P
Giancarlo Pajetta
Pasquale Panico
Giovanni Pesce
Claudio Petruccioli
Luigi Pintor
Barbara Pollastrini

R
Tullio Regge
Francesco Renda
Giuseppe Ricci
Carlo Ripa di Meana
Marco Rizzo
Rossana Rossanda

S
Cesare Salvi
Edoardo Sanguineti
Leonardo Sciascia
Marina Sereni
Altiero Spinelli

T
Palmiro Togliatti
Aldo Tortorella
Renzo Trivelli
Livia Turco

V
Dacia Valent
Maurizio Valenzi
Walter Veltroni
Nichi Vendola
Ugo Vetere
Vittorio Vidali
Marta Vincenzi
Luciano Violante
Vincenzo Visco

Z
Flavio Zanonato

 
Communist Party politicians